James Edwin Creighton (April 8, 1861, Pictou, Nova Scotia – October 8, 1924, Ithaca, NY), was an American philosopher who believed no system of thought can be the product of an isolated mind.

He was early influenced by Kant, Bradley and Bosanquet, and later accepted some of the views of Windelband and Heinrich Rickert, without sharing all of their opinions. Creighton differentiated between what he considered as intelligible in philosophy and what is intelligible in the natural sciences.

Since 1895 Creighton was Sage professor of logic and metaphysic at Cornell University. Creighton (1902) was the founding president of the American Philosophical Association.

His most important essays were compiled in Studies in Speculative Philosophy (Creighton, 1925; see also Sabine, 1917).

See also
 American philosophy
 List of American philosophers

References
Creighton, J. E. (1902). The purposes of a philosophical association. Philosophical Review, 11, 219–237. 
Creighton, J. E. (1909). Darwin and logic. Psychological Review, 16(3), 170–187. https://doi.org/10.1037/h0073055
Creighton, J. E. (1925). Studies in Speculative Philosophy. Periodicals Service.
Sabine, G. H. (Ed.) (1917). Philosophical essays in honor of James Edwin Creighton. New York: Macmillan.

External links
 

1861 births
1924 deaths
20th-century American philosophers
Cornell University faculty
Cornell University alumni
19th-century American philosophers